JKA may refer to:

Japan Karate Association
The FAA code for Jack Edwards Airport
JKA Foundation, regulating cycle and motorcycle racing in Japan
Jamal Khashoggi Award for courageous journalism